The 1999 Champion Hurdle was a horse race held at Cheltenham Racecourse on Tuesday 16 March 1999. It was the 70th running of the Champion Hurdle.

The winner for the second consecutive year was J. P. McManus's Istabraq, a seven-year-old gelding trained in Ireland by Aidan O'Brien and ridden by Charlie Swan.

Istabraq started the 4/9 favourite and won by three and a half lengths from his stable companion Theatreworld, who had also finished runner-up in the previous two years, with the leading British hurdler French Holly in third place. Twelve of the fourteen runners completed the course.

Race details
 Sponsor: Smurfit
 Purse: £232,800; First prize: £138,000
 Going: Good to Soft
 Distance: 2 miles 110 yards
 Number of runners: 14
 Winner's time: 3m 56.80

Full result

 Abbreviations: nse = nose; nk = neck; hd = head; dist = distance; UR = unseated rider; PU = pulled up; LFT = left at start; SU = slipped up; BD = brought down

Winner's details
Further details of the winner, Istabraq
 Sex: Gelding
 Foaled: 23 May 1992
 Country: Ireland
 Sire: Sadler's Wells; Dam: Betty's Secret (Secretariat)
 Owner: J. P. McManus
 Breeder: Shadwell Stud

References

Champion Hurdle
 1999
Champion Hurdle
Champion Hurdle
1990s in Gloucestershire